Perigramma is a genus of moths in the family Geometridae erected by Achille Guenée in 1857.

Species
Perigramma canescens (Walker, [1865])
Perigramma celerenaria (Walker, [1865])
Perigramma nervaria Guenée, 1857

References

Geometridae